Evadne Baker (August 19, 1937 – January 17, 1995) was an English actress. She was born in Cape Town, to parents of French, Dutch, and German heritage. She trained as a ballerina from the age of six, and moved to England when she was nine to continue her training in London.

She later studied in Paris and Geneva under several prominent instructors, including Margot Fonteyn. She supported herself by working as a model for Vogue magazine.

It has been claimed that she was impregnated at age 14 by the famous writer, adventurer, anthropologist and environmentalist Laurens van der Post, aged about 46 at the time and who was accompanying the girl on a sea voyage between South Africa and England.

When she was seventeen, she was rejected by Sadler's Wells Theatre because she was too tall, and she returned to South Africa to study acting and seek work in the theatre. After a year performing with the national theatre, she returned to England to study jazz dancing. In Paris she auditioned for Matt Matlex and won a role in a Las Vegas show, where she was discovered by a talent agent for 20th Century Fox who signed her to a movie contract.

Films
Baker appeared in several films, mostly in minor roles, including Seven Women from Hell (1961), Shock Treatment (1964), and The Sound of Music (1965), in which she played the role of Sister Bernice.

References

South African actresses
1937 births
1995 deaths
South African emigrants to the United Kingdom